The 1998 Oklahoma State Cowboys football team represented the Oklahoma State University during the 1998 NCAA Division I-A football season. They participated as members of the Big 12 Conference in the South Division. They played their home games at Lewis Field in Stillwater, Oklahoma, United States. They were coached by head coach Bob Simmons.

Schedule

References

Oklahoma State
Oklahoma State Cowboys football seasons
Oklahoma State Cowboys football